Townsendia can refer to:

Taxonomy
Townsendia (fly), a genus of flies in the family Asilidae
Townsendia (plant), a genus of plants in the family Asteraceae